Rhydian Vaughan (born 10 March 1988), also known by his stage name Feng Xiaoyue, is a Taiwanese-British actor, best known for his performances in the films Monga, Girlfriend, Boyfriend and Winds of September.

Early life
Vaughan is of Eurasian descent; his Taiwanese mother is a performance artist, while his British father is a violinist. Vaughan graduated from East 15 Acting School, a British performing arts school, in 2011.

Filmography

Films

Television

Music videos

Discography

Singles

Awards and nominations

References

External links

Taiwanese male film actors
Taiwanese male television actors
21st-century Taiwanese male actors
British male film actors
British male television actors
21st-century British male actors
British people of Taiwanese descent
Taiwanese people of British descent
1988 births
Living people
People from Llanidloes
Alumni of East 15 Acting School